German North Korean or North Korean German may refer to:
Germans in North Korea
North Koreans in Germany
Germany–North Korea relations
Multiracial people of German and North Korean descent